Justina Eze is a Nigerian diplomat and politician who was the member of the House of Representative for Uzo Uwani during Nigeria's Second Republic.

Eze was a former Nigerian ambassador to Guinea Bissau and Cape Verde and a former Presidential Liaison Officer to the House of Representatives during Olusgeun Obasanjo's democratic rule.

She was the first woman from the Eastern Region, Nigeria to get into the House of Representatives in 1979. She joined Dr. Nnamdi Azikiwe and Chief Jim Nwobodo to build the National peoples party (NPP) and was one of the three women that made it to the Federal House of Representatives in 1979. She is also one of the founding mothers of People Democratic Party(Nigeria). She has always encourage women and paved way for them in politics.

She was born in Nimbo/Uzuwani Local Government Area of Nsukka senatorial zone of Enugu State.

References

Year of birth missing (living people)
Living people
Nigerian women ambassadors
Members of the House of Representatives (Nigeria)
Ambassadors of Nigeria to Cape Verde
Ambassadors of Nigeria to Guinea-Bissau